Delta is a monthly, popular science magazine published by the University of Warsaw in cooperation with:

 The Polish Mathematical Society,
 The Polish Physical Society,
 The Polish Astronomical Society,
 The Polish Information Processing Society.

It has been published since 1974 (with a short break during the Martial law in Poland) and covers topics in mathematics, physics, astronomy, computer science and biology. The content of the Delta is directed towards high school and university students as well as researchers. The articles are mainly written by the researchers working at Polish universities, however, the magazine has also seen contributions from students. The chef editor since 2018 is Szymon Charzyński.

References

External links 
 Miesięcznik Delta – official web page of the magazine
 Past issues of the Delta 
 The High School Students' P. Domańskiego Competition 

1974 establishments in Poland
Education magazines
Magazines established in 1974
Magazines published in Warsaw
Monthly magazines published in Poland
Polish-language magazines
Popular science magazines
University of Warsaw